Juncus drummondii is a species of rush known by the common name Drummond's rush. It is native to western North America from northern Canada and Alaska to New Mexico, where it grows in wet coniferous forest and alpine meadows and slopes. This is a perennial herb forming narrow, erect tufts to about 40 centimeters in maximum height. The leaves are basal and most have no real blades; instead they form a sheath around the stem a few centimeters long. The inflorescence is borne on the side of the stem toward the top. There is a long, cylindrical bract at the base which extends out past the flowers. Each flower is on a thin pedicel. The thick tepals are dark brown, sometimes with green striping and thin, transparent edges. There are six stamens with yellowish anthers, and red stigmas. The fruit is a capsule.

References

External links
Jepson Manual Treatment
Photo gallery

drummondii
Plants described in 1852
Flora of Northern Canada
Flora of Western Canada
Flora of the Western United States
Flora without expected TNC conservation status